Rome is the English form of the name of the capital city of Italy, and formerly capital of the Roman Empire and seat of the papacy, where it consistently has been called Roma.

Rome may also refer to:

Ancient history 
 Ancient Rome, a civilization of classical antiquity, comprising:
 The Roman Kingdom (753–509 BC), the regal period following the founding of Rome
 The Roman Republic (509–27 BC), the era of expansion under republican government
 The Roman Empire (27 BC–AD 395), the era of autocratic rule by emperors
 The Western Roman Empire (AD 395–476), the western division of the late Empire until its fall

Arts, entertainment, and media

Games 
 Europa Universalis: Rome, a 2008 computer strategy game
 Rome: Pathway to Power, a 1992 computer adventure game
 Rome: Total War, a 2004 computer strategy game
 Total War: Rome II, a 2013 sequel to the computer strategy game Rome: Total War

Music 
 Rome (band), Luxembourgian neofolk band
 Rome (R&B singer) (Jerome Woods, born 1970), American contemporary R&B singer
 Rome Ramirez (born 1988), known as Rome, lead singer of Sublime with Rome
 Rome (Armand Hammer album)
 Rome (Danger Mouse and Daniele Luppi album), 2011 album by Danger Mouse and Daniele Luppi
 Rome (Rome album), Rome Wood's eponymous debut album
 Rome (Josh Pyke album), 2020

Television 
 Rome (TV series), 2005 historical drama television series

Other uses in arts, entertainment, and media
 Rome, Wisconsin, a fictional town in the TV show Picket Fences
 Rome Film Festival, an annual film festival

People
 Rome (surname)

Places

United States 
 Rome, Alabama
 Rome, Georgia
 Rome, Illinois
 Rome City, Indiana
 Rome, Indiana, an unincorporated community
 Rome, Iowa
 Rome, Ellis County, Kansas
 Rome, Sumner County, Kansas
 Rome, Kentucky
 Rome, Maine
 Rome, Mississippi
 Rome, Missouri
 Rome, New York
 Rome, Ohio, a village
 Rome, Delaware County, Ohio, an unincorporated community
 Rome, Morrow County, Ohio, a ghost town
 Rome, Richland County, Ohio, an unincorporated community
 Rome, Oregon
 Rome, Pennsylvania, a borough surrounded by Rome Township, Pennsylvania
 Rome, Tennessee
 Rome, Adams County, Wisconsin, a town
 Rome (community), Adams County, Wisconsin, an unincorporated community
 Rome, Jefferson County, Wisconsin, a census-designated place

Elsewhere 
 Rome (Paris Métro), a station on Paris Métro Line 2, France
 Metropolitan City of Rome Capital, Italy

Religion 
 Diocese of Rome, the papal archbishopric in central Italy 
 Rome as pars pro toto for the Holy See and/or the whole (Roman) Catholic Church

Other 
 Romé, a wine of Spain
 Return on modeling effort (ROME),  the benefit in improving a model
 Rome apple, an apple variety also known as Rome Beauty or Red Rome
 Rome process, an international effort to define and categorize the functional gastrointestinal disorders
 Epyc Rome, the second generation of AMD's Epyc line of server processors, codenamed Rome

See also 

 
 Ancient Rome (disambiguation)
 New Rome (disambiguation)
 Rhome (disambiguation)
 Roam (disambiguation)
 Roma (disambiguation)
 Roman (disambiguation)
 Roman Empire (disambiguation)
 Roman Republic (disambiguation)
 Rome II (disambiguation)
 Rome Airport (disambiguation)
 Rome Township (disambiguation)